= Indusia =

Indusia can refer to:

- indusia (fern), part of the fern reproductive structures
- Indusia (insect), a trichopteran larval case morphogenus.
